Walk Through This World with the Folk Implosion is the first EP by The Folk Implosion. It was released on cassette by Chocolate Monk in 1993 and re-released on 7" vinyl in 1994 on Drunken Fish Records.

Track listing

"Eternal Party"
"School" (Nirvana)
"My Head Really Hurts"
"I Know What I Want Today"
"Third Mind Trouble"
"Walk Through This World"
"End Of The First Side"
"I Remember The Angels"
"Hey, You Don't Say"
"Won't Back Down" (Tom Petty)
"So Sweet I Swear"
"End"

Personnel
Lou Barlow - bass guitar, drums, vocals
John Davis - guitar, drums, vocals

1994 EPs
The Folk Implosion albums